Neuronal protein 3.1 is a protein that in humans is encoded by the NREP gene. It is highly expressed in the brain.

References

External links

Further reading